Dr. Suma Sudhindra is a classical musician and veena exponent from India, in the Carnatic Music genre. She is a performer, teacher, researcher and administrator. She was awarded Karnataka's second highest civilian award, the Rajyotsava Award, in the year 2001.

Early days and personal life

She was trained by her gurus vidhwan Raja Rao and vidhwan Chitti Babu.

She is based in Bangalore. Her spouse is a dentist and she has two daughters. She is an avid bonsai collector.

Career

She has the Chittibabu style known for the melodic sounds of the Veena. She has widely toured and given performances in United States, the United Kingdom, Singapore and Malaysia. She has also led numerous veena  ensembles over the years.

Tarangini veena

Dr Suma has created the "Tarangini Veena" which is a compact version of the veena. 
It is a highly portable and compact version of the saraswati veena and helps Veena players out of india have access to the instrument as it is easily transportable.

The tarangini Veena lacks a resonator, but instead has a Magnetic pickup

Carnatic-Jazz
She has rendered numerous fusion performances along with Dutch Jazz group Spinifex for many years.

Other initiatives

Suma is the Director outreach for the Centre For Indian Music Experience (IME), a new kind of museum in the making where one can touch, feel and experience music.

She co-founded the Artists’ Introspective Movement (AIM) along with kuchipudi danseuse Veena Murthy Vijay. AIM organizes the Bangalore International Arts Festival (BIAF) since 2007. BIAF is a cultural platform for artists.

Awards & felicitations

 Karnataka Rajyotsava Award in 2001
 Kalaimamani Award from the Tamil Nadu Government
 Ganakalashree Award from Karnataka Ganakala Parishat
 "Vainika Kalabhushani" from Thyagaraja Ganasabha

References

Saraswati veena players
Musicians from Bangalore
Living people
Indian music educators
Women educators from Karnataka
Educators from Karnataka
20th-century Indian educators
Women violinists
Recipients of the Rajyotsava Award 2001
Carnatic violinists
20th-century Indian musicians
20th-century violinists
Indian jazz musicians
Women jazz musicians
Indian women classical musicians
Women Carnatic musicians
Carnatic musicians
Women musicians from Karnataka
Year of birth missing (living people)
20th-century Indian women musicians
21st-century Indian musicians
21st-century Indian women musicians
Women music educators
21st-century violinists
20th-century women educators
Recipients of the Sangeet Natak Akademi Award